Theme Meitner (born 13 February 1994) is a German film actor.

Life and career

Meitner first came into contact with the acting profession when his parents applied to him at the age of seven, without his knowledge, on the ZDF television show Lass Dich Surprise with Thomas Ohrner. There he was allowed to meet his then idol Jan Fedder, the actor of Dirk Matthies in the ARD evening series Großstadtrevier. From there, Meitner's interest in acting was awakened. In 2004 he visited the children's play club of the Württembergische Landesbühne Esslingen and played there for a year.

After a successful casting, he played the role of Zettel in the children's and youth television series Ein Fall für B.A.R.Z. from 2005 to 2007. Since then, several TV roles have followed, including in the film Das geteilte Glück (2009), which was awarded best television film at the Biberach Film Festival in 2010. He also took on roles in television series such as SOKO 5113 and SOKO Stuttgart as well as in short films.

In 2012, Meitner completed his Abitur at the Georgii-Gymnasium in Esslingen am Neckar. Since October 2013 he has been studying acting at the Hochschule für Schauspielkunst "Ernst Busch" Berlin.

From 2017 to 2021 he played in the ZDF crime series Der Alte as Lenny Wandmann after the age-related departure of Michael Ande next to Stephanie Stumph and Ludwig Blochberger the third co-investigator at the side of the old Jan-Gregor Kremp. However, Lenny Wandmann was not a commissioner, but a computer scientist with Asperger's syndrome, whosetasks lay in the field of research and the analysis of computer data.

References

External links
Thimo Meitner
Thimo Meitner, Schauspieler, München
Thimo Meitner | Agentur Carola Studlar

Living people
German film actors
Male actors from Stuttgart
1994 births
Audiobook narrators